Stephen Paul Donaghue  (born 7 January 1973) is an Australian barrister and constitutional lawyer and the present Solicitor-General of Australia. Donaghue has been Solicitor-General since 16 January 2017, having been appointed following the resignation of Justin Gleeson.

Born in 1973, Donaghue was educated at Whitefriars College in Donvale, then studied for a Bachelor of Arts and Bachelor of Laws at the University of Melbourne, where he was editor of the Melbourne University Law Review and won the Supreme Court Prize. In 1996, Donaghue was granted a Menzies Scholarship and attended Magdalen College at the University of Oxford from which he received a doctorate.

In 1995, Donaghue joined the firm MinterEllison as a solicitor. He was an associate to Kenneth Hayne, former Justice of the High Court of Australia. He became a barrister in 2001, and in 2011 was appointed as a Senior Counsel, becoming a Queen's Counsel in 2014 when the title was restored by the Victorian government.

References

1973 births
Living people
Solicitors-General of Australia
Australian barristers
Australian King's Counsel
Melbourne Law School alumni
University of Melbourne alumni
Alumni of Magdalen College, Oxford